The Woman from Mellon's is a 1910 silent short film directed by D. W. Griffith and starring Mary Pickford and Billy Quirk. It was produced and distributed by the Biograph Company.

It is preserved in the Library of Congress collection.

Cast
Billy Quirk as Harry Townsend
George Nichols as James Pertersby
Mary Pickford as Mary Petersby, The Daughter

rest of cast
Linda Arvidson as Detective
Dorothy Bernard -
Kate Bruce as Maid
Charles Craig as Detective/Policeman
Frank Evans as Butler
Francis J. Grandon as In First Office/In Second Office
Ruth Hart as Maid
Guy Hedlund as Butler
Dell Henderson as In Second Office
James Kirkwood as Minister
Henry Lehrman as In Second Office
Owen Moore -

See also
 List of American films of 1910

References

External links
The Woman from Mellon's at IMDb.com

1910 films
American silent short films
Films directed by D. W. Griffith
Biograph Company films
American black-and-white films
1910s American films